Michell Butler may refer to:
Michelle Butler-Emmett (born 1983), South African badminton player
Mitchell Butler (born 1970), American basketball player and sports agent